Bánovce nad Bebravou is a town in Slovakia, in the Trenčín Region.

Names
The name is derived from the personal name or title Bán meaning "the village of Bán's people". "Nad Bebravou" means "above Bebrava" (beaver river). The eldest inscription mentioning the town as villa Ben dates back to 1232. Other recorded names are Villa Ban (1318), Banowitz (1389), oppidum Banowcz (1439), Ban (1467), Banowcze (1471).

Geography
It is located at the northernmost edge of the Danubian Hills, at the foothills of the Strážovské vrchy mountains at the confluence of the Radiša and Bebrava rivers. It is 25 km away from Prievidza, 30 km from Trenčín and 50 km from Nitra.

History 
The oldest settlement stems from the Bronze Age.  The town was promoted in 1376 into free royal town (until 1389, then landlord township). In the Middle Ages, Bánovce became an important trade centre - for shoemakers, carpenters, smiths, butchers, weavers and others. In 1633, the Ottomans encroaching from the south plundered the town. The first elementary school was opened in the 17th century. During the first Czechoslovak republic, it was an agricultural-crafting town. During World War II, the town was taken by Romanian troops of the 1st Army on 5 April 1945. After World War II, automobile, furniture and textile industries developed.

Places of interest
 Saint Nicholas Church - an originally Gothic church from the 15th century
 Holy Trinity Church
 Synagogue - now used as a Lutheran church
 Country castle in the Horné Ozorovce borough

In total, there are 15 cultural memorials in the town and its boroughs inscribed in the central inventory of culture memorials in Bratislava.

The Bánovská Parenica (the most famous cycling race in the region) is regularly organized every year on 6 September and goes through this village. The competition is available for a high range of cyclists. It starts in the town of Bánovce nad Bebravou and is organized by the regional club of tourists   and JPL.

Demographics
According to the 2001 census, the town had 20,901 inhabitants. 97% of inhabitants were Slovaks, 1.4% Roma and 0.7% Czechs. The religious makeup was 73.9% Roman Catholics, 11.5% people with no religious affiliation, and 11.3% Lutherans.

Boroughs
The city consists of the following boroughs:
Bánovce nad Bebravou
Biskupice
Dolné Ozorovce
Horné Ozorovce
Malé Chlievany

Famous people 
 Jozef Forgáč (1904 – 1966), SDB,  Roman Catholic priest end Missionary (Chile, Argentina).

Twin towns — sister cities

Bánovce nad Bebravou is twinned with:

 Kopřivnice, Czech Republic
 Milotice, Czech Republic
 Lubliniec, Poland
 Esztergom, Hungary

See also
 List of municipalities and towns in Slovakia

References

Genealogical resources
The records for genealogical research are available at the state archive "Statny Archiv in Nitra, Slovakia".
 Roman Catholic church records (births/marriages/deaths): 1700-1895 (parish A)

External links

Official website
Surnames of living people in Banovce nad Bebravou

Cities and towns in Slovakia